Kill Me Please is a 2010 French-Belgian comedy film directed by .

Plot
Dr Kruger runs a clinic for rich patients who want to die. If they convince him that they might have a reason for suicide he assists them.

Cast 
 Aurélien Recoing as Docteur Kruger
 Benoît Poelvoorde as Monsieur Demanet
 Bouli Lanners as Monsieur Vidal
 Philippe Nahon as Monsieur Antoine
 Virginie Efira as Inspector Evrard
 Virgile Bramly as Virgile

References

External links 

2010 comedy films
2010 films
French comedy films
Films about suicide
2010s French films